Groovie Mann (born Frank Nicholas Nardiello) is a founding member of industrial disco band My Life with the Thrill Kill Kult.

History
Nardiello was first in a band called Special Affect with Al Jourgensen, before the latter left to form Ministry in 1981. Nardiello then joined London-based post-punk band Drowning Craze, singing on their second and third singles, "Trance" (1981) and "Heat" (1982).

While touring with Ministry in 1986, Nardiello and Jourgensen wrote a few songs together for a film Nardiello had been working on with friend Buzz McCoy.  Titled Hammerhead Housewife and the Thrill Kill Kult, the film was never finished, but its title was the inspiration for their new band, and the soundtrack was released as an EP with Wax Trax! Records. After that, Nardiello founded My Life with the Thrill Kill Kult in 1987.

Nardiello performed vocals on the Fred Giannelli track "Mindblower" for his 1991 EP Fred.

Nardiello teamed up with Ministry guitarist William Tucker from 1998–1999 to record songs for an album, People Next Door, which was released under the moniker Darling Kandie in 2002.

Nardiello is gay. He came out in 1977.

References

External links
 My Life with the Thrill Kill Kult official site

Living people
American industrial musicians
American rock singers
My Life with the Thrill Kill Kult members
Pigface members
Year of birth missing (living people)
American gay musicians